Bruce Gordon (born 1962 in Canada) is Titus Street Professor of Ecclesiastical History at Yale Divinity School. He previously taught at the University of St Andrews in Scotland, where he was professor of modern history and deputy director of the St Andrews Reformation Studies Institute. Gordon specializes in late-medieval and early modern religious culture. His 1990 dissertation was entitled Clerical Discipline and the Church Synods in Zürich, 1532-1580.

Works
Clerical Discipline and the Rural Reformation: The Synod in Zürich, 1532-1580 (Zürcher Beiträge zur Reformationsgeschichte) (Peter Lang International Academic Publishers 1992) 
 (editor with Peter Marshall) The Place of the Dead in Late Medieval and Early Modern Europe (Cambridge University Press 2000) 
The Swiss Reformation (Manchester University Press 2002) 
 (editor with Emidio Campi) Architect of Reformation: An Introduction to Heinrich Bullinger, 1504-1575 (Baker Academic 2004) 
Calvin (Yale University Press, 2009) 
John Calvin’s Institutes of the Christian Religion: A Biography. (Princeton 2016) 
 (editor with Carl Trueman) The Oxford Handbook of Calvin and Calvinism (Oxford University Press 2021) 
Zwingli: God's Armed Prophet (Yale University Press 2021)

References

Yale Divinity School faculty
21st-century American historians
20th-century Canadian historians
Living people
Place of birth missing (living people)
1962 births